The 2022 Thomas Cup group stage was held at the Impact Arena in Bangkok, Thailand, from 8 to 11 May 2022.

The group stage was first stage of the tournament where only the two highest-placing teams in each of the four groups advanced to the knockout stage.

Draw
The original draw for the tournament was conducted on 1 April 2022, at 15:00 ICT, at Arnoma Grand Bangkok in Bangkok, Thailand. The 16 teams will be drawn into four groups each containing four teams and were allocated to four pots based on the World Team Rankings of 22 February 2022.

Group composition

Group A

Indonesia vs Singapore

South Korea vs Thailand

Indonesia vs Thailand

South Korea vs Singapore

Indonesia vs South Korea

Thailand vs Singapore

Group B

China vs France

Denmark vs Algeria

Denmark vs France

China vs Algeria

Denmark vs China

France vs Algeria

Group C

India vs Germany

Chinese Taipei vs Canada

Chinese Taipei vs Germany

India vs Canada

Chinese Taipei vs India

Germany vs Canada

Group D

Malaysia vs England

Japan vs United States

Japan vs England

Malaysia vs United States

Japan vs Malaysia

England vs United States

References

Thomas Group stage